Fangcun is a town of Yuhua District, in the southeastern suburbs of Shijiazhuang, Hebei, People's Republic of China, located along China National Highway 308. , it has 2 residential communities and 6 villages under its administration.

See also
List of township-level divisions of Hebei

References

Township-level divisions of Hebei